
Year 182 BC was a year of the pre-Julian Roman calendar. At the time it was known as the Year of the Consulship of Tamphilus and Paullus (or, less frequently, year 572 Ab urbe condita). The denomination 182 BC for this year has been used since the early medieval period, when the Anno Domini calendar era became the prevalent method in Europe for naming years.

Events 
 By place 
 Asia Minor 
 The king of Bithynia, Prusias I Chlorus dies and is succeeded by his son, who rules as Prusias II.

Births 
 Ptolemy VIII Euergetes II, king of the Ptolemaic dynasty in Egypt (d. 116 BC)

Deaths 
 Prusias I Chlorus, king of Bithynia (b. c. 228 BC)

References